Moncho Iglesias Míguez (born 6 April 1974, Vigo) is a Galician writer and translator.

Early life
Bachelor of Spanish Philology from the University of Vigo, he is doing his PDH in Galician Philology, with a thesis that compares Palestinian and Galician folktales. He lived in Palestine, where he taught Spanish, at Bethlehem University and An-Najah University, Nablus, and later on in Chongqing.

He has collaborated with the newspapers Vieiros, and  Xornal de Galicia, and the magazines A Nosa Terra and Animal, and was correspondent of the Radio Galega. He currently works with Tempos Novos , Dorna and Praza Pública.

Literary works

Poetry 
 -3'141516, 2001, Centro Universitario Indoamericano (Mexico).
 Oda ás nais perennes con fillos caducos entre os brazos, 2007, Positivas.
 pedras de Plastilina, 2012, Toxosoutos. 
 Avoíña/Abuelita, 2013, Parnass Ediciones. Bilingual Galician-Spanish.
 Tren, O tren lírico que cruza China visto con ollos vigueses, 2018, Urutau.
 Cheira, 2020, Urutau.

Narrative 
 Tres cores: azul,>2010, Estaleiro editora.
 Don Pepe Do Peirao.

Essay 
 Os contos de animais na tradición oral palestina, 2008, Fundación Araguaney.

Translations 
 Premio 2005 de relato, poesía e tradución da Universidade de Vigo ("Unha rosa para Emily", by William Faulkner), 2015, Edicións Xerais.
 O condutor de autobús que quería ser Deus, by Etgar Keret, 2006, Rinoceronte Editora, from Hebrew.
 Saudades de Kissinger, by Etgar Keret, 2011, Rinoceronte Editora, from Hebrew.
 Carné de identidade, by Mahmoud Darwish, 2012, Edicións Barbantesa.
 Premio 2014 de relato, poesía e tradución da Universidade de Vigo ("A terra das laranxas tristes", by Ghassan Kanafani), 2014, Edicións Xerais.
 Premio 2015 de relato, poesía e tradución da Universidade de Vigo ("Fío", by Dena Afrasiabi)', 2015, Edicións Xerais.
 Un mapa do lar, by Randa Jarrar, 2015, Hugin e Munin.
 Premio 2016 de relato, poesía e tradución da Universidade de Vigo ("O último rei de Noruega", by Amos Oz), 2016, Edicións Xerais.
 Premio 2017 de relato, poesía e tradución da Universidade de Vigo ("A historia secreta da alfombra voadora", by Azhar Abidi e "As mozas do edificio", by Randa Jarrar), 2017, Edicións Xerais.
 Premio 2018 de relato, poesía e tradución da Universidade de Vigo ("O sol e as súas flores", by Rupi Kaur, 2018, Edicións Xerais.
 Esfumado, by Ahmed Masoudhttps://www.ahmedmasoud.co.uk/, 2022, :gl:Urutau.

Collective works 
 Homenaxe a Álvaro Cunqueiro no seu XXV cabodano, 2006.
 I Certame literario de relato breve e libertario, 2007.
 A Coruña á luz das letras, 2008, Trifolium.
 Entre os outros e nós. Estudos literarios e culturais, 2008.
 Diversidade lingüística e cultural no ensino de linguas, 2009, tresCtres.
 En defensa do Poleiro. Os escritores galegos en Celanova, 2010, Toxosoutos.
 Os dereitos humanos: unha ollada múltipleOs dereitos humanos. Unha ollada múltiple, 2011, Universidade de Santiago de Compostela.
 150 Cantares para Rosalía de Castro (2015, e-book).
 As cantigas de Martín Codax en 55 idiomas, Martin Codax convértese no autor galego traducido a máis linguas, 2018, Universidade de Vigo.
 A lingua viaxeira, 2022, Axóuxere.

Prizes 
 Third Poetry Prize Féile Filíochta, Dublin, 1999.
 Narrative Prize, Concello de Mugardos, 2005.
 Special mention, Narrative Prize, Concello de Mugardos, 2010.
 Second Prize, Certame Poético Concello de Rois, 2014.
 First Prize, IV Certame Literario das Letras Galegas en Frankfourt, 2015.
 Second Prize, Concurso do Día das Letras Galegas, Concello de Rábade, 2017.
 Translation Prizes, Premio de tradución da Universidade de Vigo, 2005, 2014, 2015, 2016, 2017 & 2018.
 Johan Carballeira Prize in Journalism, 2018
 First Prize, XV Certame Literario Terras de Chamoso, O Corgo, 2021

References

External links
Galician Writers Association
Articles in Vieiros
Interview 
[view-source:http://www.atlantico.net/articulo/vigo/tren-lirico-cruza-china-visto-ollos-vigueses/20181227000059684706.html/ Interview]

1974 births
Living people
Spanish male writers
Spanish translators
Academic staff of An-Najah National University
University of Vigo alumni